Arifin Ginuni (born May 26, 1983) is an Indonesian footballer who currently plays for Persiram Raja Ampat in the Indonesia Super League.

Club statistics

References

External links

1983 births
Association football defenders
Living people
Indonesian footballers
West Papuan sportspeople
Liga 1 (Indonesia) players
Persiram Raja Ampat players
PSAP Sigli players
Indonesian Premier Division players
Persibo Bojonegoro players
PSKS Krakatau Steel Cilegon footballers
Gresik United players
People from West Papua (province)